Storyville was a blues-rock band formed in 1993 in Austin, Texas, USA. Drummer Chris Layton and bassist Tommy Shannon, former members of Arc Angels and the rhythm section for Stevie Ray Vaughan's band Double Trouble, formed the band with Craig Ross, David Lee Holt and David Grissom after a jam session at Antone's. After releasing an album on November Records in 1993, the band won a total of nine Austin Music awards; they became stalwarts on the local music scene and toured nationally. Malford Milligan replaced Ross in 1994. They subsequently signed to major label Atlantic Records, for whom they recorded two albums before breaking up. The single "Born Without You", from their 1998 release Dog Years, reached #28 on the Billboard Mainstream Rock chart.

Members
Malford Milligan – lead vocals
David Grissom – guitar/vocals
David Lee Holt - guitar/vocals
Tommy Shannon – bass
Chris Layton – drums

Discography
Bluest Eyes - November Records, 1993
A Piece of Your Soul - Atlantic Records, 1996 U.S. Blues #5
Dog Years - Atlantic Records, 1998 U.S. Heatseekers #47
Live At Antones - Storyville Records, 2007

See also
Music of Austin

References

External links
Band website
Vintage Guitar Interview - David Grissom and David Holt - Two-Guitar Story
David Grissom's website
David Lee Holt's website
Tommy Shannon's website

Musical groups from Austin, Texas
Musical groups established in 1994
1994 establishments in Texas